The 1976 European Formula Two season was contested over 12 rounds. Équipe Elf Switzerland driver Jean-Pierre Jabouille clinched the championship title.

Calendar

Note:

Race 1, 6, 9 and 12 were held in two heats, with results shown in aggregate.

Race 1 and 6 was won by a graded driver, all graded drivers are shown in Italics

Final point standings

Driver

For every race points were awarded: 9 points to the winner, 6 for runner-up, 4 for third place, 3 for fourth place, 2 for fifth place and 1 for sixth place. No additional points were awarded. The best 9 results count. No driver had a point deduction.

Note:

Only drivers which were not graded were able to score points.

References

Formula Two
European Formula Two Championship seasons